Halfords Group PLC is the UK's largest retailer of motoring and cycling products and services. Through Halfords Autocentre, they provide vehicle servicing, MOT, maintenance and repairs in the United Kingdom. 

Halfords Group is listed on the London Stock Exchange.

History

Halfords was founded by Frederick Rushbrooke, in Birmingham in 1892, as a wholesale ironmongery. The company takes its name from Halford Street in Leicester, where Rushbrooke opened a store in 1902 and started selling cycling goods. 

Halfords opened its two hundredth store in 1931, and purchased the Birmingham Bicycle Company in 1945. It opened its three hundredth store in 1968. The company became a part of Burmah Oil in 1965, following a takeover battle between Burmah and Smiths Industries.

The company was acquired by the Ward White Group in 1983, from whom the Boots Group acquired it in 1989. Halfords was later demerged from the Boots Group in 2002.

Halfords was taken over by CVC Capital Partners in July 2003 and, in June 2004, it was floated on the London Stock Exchange. 

Halfords rebranded in February 2003, to the black and orange logo it has today.

Halfords entered into a Collaboration Agreement with Autobacs Seven Co. on 11 July 2005, a Japan based car accessory retailer with chains of stores all over the world and is best known for being the title sponsor of Super GT and D1 Grand Prix.

Autobacs acquired 5% (11,400,000 shares) of the company on 13 December 2005, at approximately ¥7.5 billion.

Halfords opened its first shop in Central Europe in June 2007, in a village near Prague. In the next two years, it opened five more stores in the Czech Republic and one in Poland (Wrocław, 2008). Expansion into Central Europe was seen as an opportunity, because the cars on the road tend to be slightly older there, so people would be more adept at car maintenance.

In March 2010, Halfords ceased its international expansion to refocus on the domestic market.

In February 2010, the company announced its expansion into autocare and that it was acquiring the chain Nationwide Autocentre MOT from private equity firm Phoenix.

In June 2014, Halfords acquired the British bicycle manufacturer Boardman Bikes Ltd. (founded by the professional cyclist Chris Boardman, Sarah Mooney and Alan Ingarfield) for undisclosed sum.

Halfords acquired Swansea based Tredz Bikes, an online retailer of premium bikes and cycling accessories, and Wheelies, the largest provider of bicycle replacement for insurance companies in the United Kingdom, for £18.4m, from founders Keith and Michael Jones, on 24 May 2016. The group turned over around £32m, in the year to 29 February 2016, making a profit, before financial charges of £2.4m.

At a Capital Markets Day in September 2018, Halfords announced a new strategy, entitled 'To Inspire and Support a Lifetime of Motoring and Cycling'. It has three priorities: 

 Inspire customers with a differentiated and specialist offer
 Support customers through an integrated and more convenient service
 Enable a lifetime of motoring and cycling 

In 2019, CEO Graham Stapleton announced he was placing greater focus on growing Halford's motoring services business. In November 2019, Halfords acquired McConechy’s garages in Scotland and Tyres on the Drive mobile tyre fitting service. In March 2021, the business acquired Universal Tyres and Garages.

Since 2020, Halfords sells E-bikes and E-scooters.

In December 2021, Halfords acquired rival tyres and auto-care chain National Tyres and Autocare for £62m. The chain will continue to trade under the same name following the acquisition.

in October 2022, Halfords announced it had acquired the UK commercial tyre business, Lodge Tyre Company for £37.2m.

Operations 
Since 2010, Halfords Retail has operated around 465 stores, of which about twenty two are in the Republic of Ireland, and the others in the United Kingdom.

As of June 2021, Halfords has 404 stores, 3 Performance Cycling stores (trading as Tredz and Giant), 374 garages (trading as Halfords Autocentres, McConechys and Universal Tyres and Autocentres) and 143 mobile service vans (trading as Halfords Mobile Expert and Tyres on the Drive) and 192 Commercial vans.

Sponsorship
In 1987, Halfords sponsored the team of Professional Road Cycling, ANC Halfords, and that year, entered the Tour de France. However, the team ran out of money, at the end of the season, and officially disbanded.

The team won the overall BTCC Drivers Championship, in 2005 and 2006, with driver Matt Neal. In March 2007, Halfords sponsored the Team Dynamics BTCC racing team, under the name of Team Halfords, and in January 2008, Halfords started sponsoring a mixed professional bike team, Team Halfords Bikehut, headed by Nicole Cooke.

Halfords announces a 15 month partnership to sponsor ITV National Weather from October 2018.

In 2021, Halfords announced it would be sponsoring the Team Dynamics BTCC racing team with drivers Gordon Shedden and Daniel Rowbottom.

Cycle Republic
In November 2014, Halfords announced it was going to revive its Cycle Republic chain of specialist bicycle stores, primarily focused on urban cycling and commuting, which is reflected in the brand's styling. The first store was opened in London, on 12 December 2014. The company's shop estate twenty two shops, and an ecommerce website operation offering an extended product range, as well as financing options.

The company's flagship store in Canary Wharf was opened by Olympian, Victoria Pendleton, in January 2018.

Cycle Republic sponsored the racing team, Morvélo Basso, for 2018. The company also provides event support at cyclo sportives around the country, including Etape Loch Ness, Palace2Palace and Velo Birmingham. The company announced a new, strategic partnership with the folding bike manufacturer Brompton, in the end of 2018.
Cycle Republic ceased trading under that name and the subcompany merged with another chain bought by Halfords called Tredz, which Halfords have stated will uphold any extended warranties.

References

External links

 Official website

Automotive part retailers
Companies based in Redditch
Retail companies established in 1892
CVC Capital Partners companies
Retail companies of the United Kingdom
Cycle retailers
Companies listed on the London Stock Exchange
2004 initial public offerings
British brands
1892 establishments in England